Boosted Dart is a United States single-stage sounding rocket of the Loki family.  Between 1966 and 1968, 39 of these rockets were launched by NASA. The Boosted Dart has a length of 3.30 metres, a diameter of 0.1 metres and a maximum flight altitude of 75 kilometres.

External links 
 

Sounding rockets of the United States